Melsungen is a small climatic spa town in the Schwalm-Eder district in northern Hesse, Germany. In 1987, the town hosted the 27th Hessentag state festival.

Geography
Melsungen lies on the river Fulda in the North Hesse Highlands. The streams Pfieffe and Kehrenbach, flow into the Fulda in the town. A few kilometres downstream, the river Eder flows into the Fulda.

Location
The nearest large towns are Kassel (downstream, about 22 km to the north) and Bad Hersfeld (upstream, about 32 km to the southeast).

Constituent communities
Melsungen comprises several smaller communities. In addition to the main community, which is also called Melsungen, there are seven communities named Adelshausen, Günsterode, Kehrenbach, Kirchhof, Obermelsungen, Röhrenfurth and Schwarzenberg.

History
Historical records of the town date from 802, but it was likely settled much earlier, during the Hallstatt period (9th to 4th Centuries BCE).

Middle Ages
Melsungen had developed into a small town (burgus) by 1189. The town's coat of arms also originated at this time.

In the course of its history, Melsungen often changed hands. The fiercest fighting over the town was between the Archbishops of Mainz and the Landgraves of Hesse and Thuringia.

Melsungen achieved its importance from its location at the crossroads of three mediaeval trade routes, the Sälzerweg, running east–west; the Nürnberger Straße, running north–south; and Durch die langen Hessen (roughly translated "Through the Long Hesse").

Modern Age
 
In 1554, a fire destroyed parts of the heart of town. In 1637, during the Thirty Years' War, the constituent community of Günsterode was laid waste.

From 1821 to 1974, Melsungen was an administrative centre and an independent district seat, until the Melsungen district was combined with the neighbouring Fritzlar-Homberg and Ziegenhain districts.

The town's 14,000 or so inhabitants call themselves Bartenwetzer ("Axe whetters").

Coat of arms
The old seal and today's civic coat of arms have their roots in the late 12th century. Heraldically, the arms might be described thus: In azure a town gate and tower argent – with roof gules surmounted by two finials or – flanked by crenellated town walls argent.

The town's official blazon describes the roof as "tile-red" – not truly "gules" (i.e. red). The arms can be traced back to 1577.

Politics

Town council consists of 37 members. Following the municipal elections held on 26 March 2006, the seats were apportioned thus:

The town executive consists of six councillors and the mayor. Four of these seats are held by the SPD, and one seat each by the CDU and FDP.

List of elected mayors:
1998–2004: Karl-Heinz Dietzel (SPD)
2004–2013: Dieter Runzheimer (SPD)
2013–incumbent: Markus Boucsein

Places of interest

 Fachwerkstadt (compact area featuring half-timbered houses in the Old Town)
 Town Hall (from 1556), with Axe Whetter in the tower
 Schloss (stately home built between 1550 and 1557 by Landgrave Philip) with garden
 Marketplace
 Bartenwetzerbrücke ("Axe Whetters' Bridge" built between 1595 and 1596)
 Gothic town church (built between 1415 and 1425)
 Hospitalskapelle St. Georg ("St George's Hospital Chapel")
 Eulenturm ("Owl Tower"; a preserved tower from the old town wall)
 Zweipfenningsbrücke ("Twopenny Bridge" from 1890)
 Stirling-Bau (B. Braun Melsungen AG's Pfieffewiesen Works)

Sport
 MT Melsungen (handball)
 Melsunger Fußballverein 08 (football)

Culture

Regular events
 Melsunger Weinfest (wine festival)
 Melsunger Kabarett-Wettbewerb (cabaret contest)
 Bad Liebenstein-Stafette (yearly relay)

Culinary specialities
 Ahle Wurst (or Aahle Worscht), a kind of Hessian hard pork sausage. Its name is a dialectal form of alte Wurst – "old sausage".

Transportation
The town lies on Autobahn A 7. Federal Highway (Bundesstraße) B 83 runs through Melsungen and Bundesstraßen B 253 and B 487 both begin (or end) here.

Melsungen lies on the Kassel—Bebra—Fulda railway line and belongs to the North Hesse Transport Network. In May 2006 the RegioTram line RT5 (Kassel-Melsungen) began. It directly connects Melsungen with downtown Kassel. The line ends at present where the Melsungen-Süd return loop is still not finished. Further stations are being built at Melsungen-Schwarzenberg und Melsungen-Bartenwetzerbrücke.

Economy
Melsungen is home to the firm of B. Braun Melsungen, which has a €3,500,000,000 yearly turnover, and about 35,100 employees worldwide (as of 2007).

Notable people

 Johannes Rhenanus (c.1528 in Melsungen–1589) salinist, theologian, alchemist, printer and author.
 Arnold Grimme (1868–1958) veterinarian and naturalist, district veterinarian in Melsungen (1895–1910)
 Reinhard Selten (1930–2016) Nobel Prize winner in Economics for his contribution to game theory
 Alwin Wagner (born 1950 in Melsungen) discus thrower and weight lifter, competed in 1984 Summer Olympics
 Christof Lauer (born 1953 in Melsungen) jazz tenor and soprano saxophonist

Twin towns
Melsungen has partnerships with the following towns:
  Dreux, France, since 1966
  Evesham, United Kingdom, since 1982
   Todi, Italy, since 1985–86
  Koudougou, Burkina Faso, since 1990
  Bad Liebenstein, Thuringia, since 1990

There is also a "friendship" with the Berlin community of Spandau.

References

External links
 Official website
 Schwarzenberg
 Obermelsungen
 Röhrenfurth
 Timber-framed photos of Melsungen

Schwalm-Eder-Kreis